was a senior retainer of the Azai clan, later Oda clan and the castle lord in command of Sawayama castle.

In 1570, at the Battle of Anegawa, he fought against Oda forces under Sakai Masahisa and kill Masahisa son, Sakai Kyuzo.

In 1573, Oda Nobunaga laid siege to the Azai clan's Sawayama Castle, which was held by Kazumasa. The castle fell. In response, Azai Nagamasa took Kazumasa's elderly mother, who he held hostage in Odani Castle, to the execution grounds for death. Kazumasa became enraged  to Nagamasa, then he defected to Nobunaga and became a vassal of the Oda clan, but later he became a priest in Mount Kōya.

References

Further reading 

1534 births
1583 deaths
Samurai
Azai clan